

Lac de Tseuzier is an artificial lake in the canton of Valais, Switzerland. It is located in the municipalities of Ayent and Icogne. It was formed by the dams of Zeuzier (156 m) and Proz-Riond (20 m) built in 1957.

See also
List of lakes of Switzerland
List of mountain lakes of Switzerland

External links
Swiss Dams: Zeuzier
Swiss Dams: Proz Riond
Electricité de la Lienne SA

Lakes of Valais
Reservoirs in Switzerland